is a district of Shibuya, Tokyo, Japan.

As of October 2020, the population of this district is 10,659. The postal code for Uehara is 151-0064.

The embassy of Côte d'Ivoire is located here, while local landmarks include the Koga Masao Museum of Music and the head offices of JASRAC.

Geography
Uehara borders Nishihara in the north, Tomigaya to the east, Komaba to the south, Shimokitazawa to the west, and Ōyamachō to the northwest.

Demography

Education

 operates public elementary and junior high schools.

Uehara 2 and 3-chome and 1-chome 6-40-ban are zoned to Uehara Elementary School (渋谷区立上原小学校). Uehara 1-chome 1-5 and 41-47-ban are zoned to Tomigaya Elementary School (渋谷区立富谷小学校). All of Uehara (1 through 3 chome) is zoned to Uehara Junior High School (渋谷区立上原中学校).

Schools in Uehara:
 Tomigaya Elementary School (渋谷区立富谷小学校)
 Uehara Elementary School (渋谷区立上原小学校)
 Uehara Junior High School (渋谷区立上原中学校)

References

Neighborhoods of Tokyo
Shibuya